The April 1555 papal conclave (April 5–9) was convoked after the death of Pope Julius III. Cardinals at the conclave generally grouped themselves into three major factions, according to their alignment with the French House of Valois, the Hapsburgs, or Italian states that remained independent of both major Catholic powers.  After preparing a conclave capitulation that compelled whichever cardinal was elected pope to maintain neutrality in European wars, cardinals from the Holy Roman Empire joined in supporting the French faction's candidate, Cardinal Marcello Cervini.  Cervini was elected Julius's successor, and chose to maintain his baptismal (birth) name as his papal name, becoming consecrated as Marcellus II.

List of participants
Pope Julius III died on March 23, 1555. Thirty-seven out of fifty-seven cardinals participated in the election of his successor:

 Gian Pietro Carafa (created cardinal on December 22, 1536) – Cardinal-Bishop of Ostia e Velletri; Dean of the Sacred College of Cardinals; Grand Inquisitor of the Supreme S.C. of the Roman and Universal Inquisition; Archbishop of Naples
 Jean du Bellay (May 21, 1535) – Cardinal-Bishop of Porto e Santa Rufina; Bishop of Le Mans
 Juan Álvarez de Toledo, O.P. (December 20, 1538) – Cardinal-Bishop of Albano; Inquisitor of Rome; Archbishop of Santiago de Compostela; Cardinal-protector of the Orders of Dominicans and Barnabites
 Rodolfo Pio di Carpi (December 22, 1536) – Cardinal-Bishop of Frascati; Administrator of Girgento; Legate in the province of Patrimonium; Cardinal-protector of Scotland; Cardinal-protector of the Orders of Capuchins and Jesuits
 Niccolò Caetani (December 22, 1536) – Cardinal-Priest of S. Eustachio; Archbishop of Capua; Administrator of Quimper
 Marcello Cervini (December 19, 1539) – Cardinal-Priest of S. Croce in Gerusalemme; Bishop of Gubbio; Librarian of the Holy Roman Church
 Miguel da Silva (December 19, 1539) – Cardinal-Priest of Santa Maria in Trastevere; Administrator of Massa Marittima
 Cristoforo Madruzzo (June 2, 1542) – Cardinal-Priest of S. Cesareo in Palatio; Bishop of Trento and Brixen
 Bartolomé de la Cueva (December 19, 1544) – Cardinal-Priest of S. Bartolomeo all’Isola
 Georges d'Armagnac (December 19, 1544) – Cardinal-Priest of SS. Giovanni e Paolo; Bishop of Rodez
 Federico Cesi (December 19, 1544) – Cardinal-Priest of S. Prisca; Administrator of Cremona; Camerlengo of the Sacred College of Cardinals
 Tiberio Crispi (December 19, 1544) – Cardinal-Priest of S. S. Agata alla Suburra; Administrator of Amalfi
 Girolamo Verallo (April 8, 1549) – Cardinal-Priest of S. Marcello
 Giovanni Angelo Medici (April 8, 1549) – Cardinal-Priest of S. Stefano in Monte Celio; Bishop of Cassano al Ionio; Governor of Campagna e Marittima; Prefect of the Tribunal of the Apostolic Signature of Grace
 Fulvio della Corgna, O.S.Io.Hieros. (November 20, 1551) – Cardinal-Priest of S. Maria in Via; Administrator of Spoleto; Legate in Ascoli Piceno and Rieti
 Giovanni Ricci (November 20, 1551) – Cardinal-Priest of S. Vitale, Gervasio e Protasio
 Giovanni Andrea Mercurio (November 20, 1551) – Cardinal-Priest of S. Ciriaco alla Terme; Archbishop of Messina
 Giacomo Puteo (November 20, 1551) – Cardinal-Priest of S. Simeon in Posterula; Archbishop of Bari
 Pietro Bertani, O.P. (November 20, 1551) – Cardinal-Priest of S. Marcellino e Pietro; Bishop of Fano
 Fabio Mignanelli (November 20, 1551) – Cardinal-Priest of S. Silvestro in Capite; Prefect of the Papal States
 Giovanni Poggio (November 20, 1551) – Cardinal-Priest of S. Anastasia; Bishop of Tropea
 Giovanni Battista Cicala (November 20, 1551) – Cardinal-Priest of S. Clemente; Legate in Campagna; Administrator of Mariana
 Girolamo Dandini (November 20, 1551) – Cardinal-Priest of S. Matteo in Merulana; Cardinal Secretary of State
 Cristoforo Ciocchi del Monte (November 20, 1551) – Cardinal-Priest of S. Prassede; Bishop of Marseilles
 Giovanni Michele Saraceni (November 20, 1551) – Cardinal-Priest of S. Maria in Aracoeli; Archbishop of Acerenza e Matera
 Francesco Pisani (July 1, 1517) – Cardinal-Deacon of S. Marco; commendatario of S. Maria in Portico; Protodeacon of the Sacred College of Cardinals; Bishop of Padua; Administrator of Narbonne
 Ercole Gonzaga (May 3, 1527) – Cardinal-Deacon of S. Maria Nuova; Bishop of Mantua; Cardinal-protector of Spain; Cardinal-protector of the Order of Canons Regular; Regent of the Duchy of Mantua
 Guido Ascanio Sforza di Santa Fiora (December 18, 1534) – Cardinal-Deacon of S. Maria in Via Lata; Camerlengo of the Holy Roman Church; Archpriest of the patriarchal Liberian Basilica; Administrator of Parma; Cardinal-protector of Spain and Armenia
 Ippolito II d'Este (December 20, 1538) – Cardinal-Deacon of S. Maria in Aquiro; Administrator of Auch; Governor of Tivoli; Cardinal-protector of France
 Giacomo Savelli (December 19, 1539) – Cardinal-Deacon of S. Nicola in Carcere Tulliano; Legate in March of Ancona
 Girolamo Capodiferro (December 19, 1544) – Cardinal-Deacon of S. Giorgio in Velabro; Bishop of Saint-Jean-de-Maurienne
 Ranuccio Farnese (December 16, 1545) – Cardinal-Deacon of S. Angelo in Pescheria; Grand penitentiary; Administrator of Ravenna; Archpriest of the patriarchal Lateran Basilica; Legate in Viterbo
 Giulio Feltre della Rovere (July 27, 1547) – Cardinal-Deacon of S. S. Pietro in Vincoli; Legate in Umbria and Perugia
 Innocenzo del Monte (May 30, 1550) – Cardinal-Deacon of S. Onofrio
 Luigi Cornaro (November 20, 1551) – Cardinal-Deacon of S. Teodoro; Archbishop of Zadar
 Roberto de Nobili (December 22, 1553) – Cardinal-Deacon of S. Maria in Domnica
 Girolamo Simoncelli (December 22, 1553) – Cardinal-Deacon of SS. Cosma e Damiano; Bishop of Orvieto

Fifteen electors were created by Julius III, twenty by Pope Paul III, one by Pope Clement VII and one by Leo X.

Absentee cardinals

Twenty cardinals were absent:

Louis de Bourbon de Vendôme (July 1, 1517) – Cardinal-Bishop of Palestrina; Administrator of Sens
François de Tournon (March 9, 1530) – Cardinal-Bishop of Sabina; Archbishop of Lyon; Superior General of the Order of Canons Regular of Saint Augustine
Robert de Lenoncourt (December 20, 1538) – Cardinal-Priest of S. Apollinare; Protopriest of the Sacred College of Cardinals; Administrator of Metz
Claude de Longuy de Givry (November 7, 1533) – Cardinal-Priest of S. Agnese in Agone; Administrator of Langres
Antoine Sanguin de Meudon (December 19, 1539) – Cardinal-Priest of S. Crisogono; Administrator of Toulouse
Giovanni Girolamo Morone (June 2, 1542) – Cardinal-Priest of S. Lorenzo in Lucina; Bishop of Novara; Papal Legate in Germany; Cardinal-protector of Austria and Ireland; Cardinal-protector of Order of Cistercians
Francisco Mendoza de Bobadilla (December 19, 1544) – Cardinal-Priest of S. Eusebio; Archbishop of Burgos
Jacques d'Annebaut (December 19, 1544) – Cardinal-Priest of S. Susanna; Bishop of Lisieux
Otto Truchess von Waldburg (December 19, 1544) – Cardinal-Priest of S. Sabina; Bishop of Augsburg
Durante Duranti (December 19, 1544) – Cardinal-Priest of SS. XII Apostoli; Bishop of Brescia
Pedro Pacheco de Villena (December 16, 1545) – Cardinal-Priest of S. Balbina; Bishop of Sigüenza; Viceroy of the Kingdom of Naples
Henry of Portugal (December 16, 1545) – Cardinal-Priest of SS. IV Coronati; Archbishop of Évora; Legate a latere in Portugal; Inquisitor General of the Portuguese Inquisition
Charles de Lorraine-Guise (July 27, 1547) – Cardinal-Priest of S. Cecilia; Archbishop of Reims
Pietro Tagliavia de Aragonia (December 22, 1553) – Cardinal-Priest of [no title assigned]; Archbishop of Palermo
Girolamo Doria (January, 1529) – Cardinal-Deacon of S. Tommaso in Parione; Administrator of Tarragona
Odet de Coligny de Châtillon (November 7, 1533) – Cardinal-Deacon of S. Adriano; Administrator of Beauvais
Alessandro Farnese (December 18, 1534) – Cardinal-Deacon of S. Lorenzo in Damaso; Vice-Chancellor of the Holy Roman Church; Archpriest of the patriarchal Vatican Basilica; Legate in Avignon; Administrator of Monreale and Cahors; Cardinal-protector of Poland, Portugal, Germany, Kingdom of Sicily, Republic of Genoa and Republic of Ragusa; Cardinal-protector of the Orders of Benedictines and Servites
Reginald Pole (December 22, 1536) – Cardinal-Deacon of S. Maria in Cosmedin; Papal Legate in England
Charles de Bourbon de Vendôme (January 9, 1548) – Cardinal-Deacon of S. Sisto; Archbishop of Rouen
Louis I de Guise (December 22, 1553) – Cardinal-Deacon of [no deaconry assigned]; Administrator of Albi

Thirteen were created by Paul III, four by Clement VII, two by Julius III and one by Leo X.

Divisions in the Sacred College

College of Cardinals was divided into three parties:

 French party – the adherents of the king Henry II of France. Their leader was Charles de Lorraine-Guise.
 Habsburg party – cardinals aligned with Emperor Charles V. Their leader was Cardinal Juan Álvarez de Toledo.
 Italian party – group of Italian cardinals headed by Alessandro Farnese, Cardinal-nephew of Paul III, with no direct connections with main Catholic powers: Habsburg Empire or France.

The election of Pope Marcellus II

The Cardinals present in Rome entered the conclave on April 5. Initially, they prepared and subscribed the conclave capitulation, which obliged elect to maintain neutrality in the European conflicts and forbade him conducting wars against Christian princes. In spite of the existed divisions, cardinals quickly achieved consensus. On April 9 at 11 p.m. they elected by acclamation Cardinal Marcello Cervini. He was proposed by French faction, but obtained also the support of the Imperial cardinals (e.g. Madruzzo) despite the expressed wishes of Charles V against Cervini's election.

On April 10 in the morning a formal scrutiny took place to confirm the election. Cervini received all votes except of his own, which he gave to Gian Pietro Carafa. He retained his baptismal name, adding to it only an ordinal number (Marcellus II). On that same day, he was consecrated bishop of Rome by Cardinal Gian Pietro Carafa, bishop of Ostia e Velletri and Dean of the College of Cardinals, and crowned by Cardinal Francesco Pisani, Protodeacon of S. Marco.

See also
 List of Popes

Notes and References

Sources

O. Panvinio, J. Strada, Epitome pontificum Romanorum a s. Petro usque ad Paulum IIII, gestorum videlicet electionisque singulorum & conclavium compendiaria narratio. Cardinalium item nomina... Onuphrio Panvinio,... authore... Ex musaeo Jacobi Stradae,... (J. de Strada edidit), Impensis Jacobi Stradae Mantuani, 1557.
 
 
 
Vatican History
Valérie Pirie, The Triple Crown: An Account of the Papal Conclaves. Pope Marcellus II (Cervini)
List of participants of papal conclave of April 1555 (by Salvador Miranda)
S. Miranda: Cardinal Marcello Cervini (Pope Marcellus II)
Bautz Biografisch-Bibliografiches Kirchenlexikon: Marcellus II
Pope Marcellus II The Catholic Encyclopedia

1555 in the Papal States
1555 04
16th-century elections
1555 in politics
16th-century Catholicism
1555 in Europe